Frost House is a historic house located at 612 St. Philip Street in Thibodaux.

Originally built in 1912 for H.W. Frost as a three-story structure, the building was reduced to its present form in c.1916 by Mrs. Frost, which inherited the house after her husband death. It's a one-and-one-half story Colonial Revival frame residence raised on tall brick piers.

The house was added to the National Register of Historic Places on August 6, 2008.

See also
 National Register of Historic Places listings in Lafourche Parish, Louisiana

References

Houses on the National Register of Historic Places in Louisiana
Colonial Revival architecture in Louisiana
Houses completed in 1916
Houses in Lafourche Parish, Louisiana
Thibodaux, Louisiana
National Register of Historic Places in Lafourche Parish, Louisiana